Charley Griffith (September 4, 1929November 22, 1999) was a NASCAR Grand National Series driver. He finished 3rd at the 1959 Daytona 500. While he finished 3rd, he was still a lap down from race winner Lee Petty.  This finish was in only his third Grand National start.  Griffith is part of NASCAR lore as his car was involved in the famous photo finish of the race.

He attempted to race in the 1960 Daytona 500, but did not qualify.

References

External links

1929 births
1999 deaths
American racing drivers
NASCAR drivers

Charlie Griffith won the first asphalt race event held at Nashville Fairgrounds Speedway on July 19th, 1958. He drove a car owned by Hart Hastings, Brooks Tune and George Tune from Shelbyville, TN.  Griffith also won the first asphalt event held at Alabama's Birmingham International Raceway (1962) driving for Harry Mewbourne.